2934 Aristophanes , provisional designation , is a carbonaceous Veritasian asteroid from the outer regions of the asteroid belt, approximately 22 kilometers in diameter. It was discovered during the Palomar–Leiden survey in 1960, and later named after ancient Greek dramatist Aristophanes.

Discovery 

Aristophanes was discovered on 25 September 1960, by Dutch astronomers Ingrid and Cornelis van Houten at Leiden, on photographic plates taken by Tom Gehrels at the Palomar Observatory, California, United States.

Palomar–Leiden survey 

The survey designation  stands for "Palomar–Leiden", named after Palomar Observatory and Leiden Observatory, which collaborated on the fruitful Palomar–Leiden survey in the 1960s. Gehrels used Palomar's Samuel Oschin telescope (also known as the 48-inch Schmidt Telescope), and shipped the photographic plates to Ingrid and Cornelis van Houten at Leiden Observatory where astrometry was carried out. The trio are credited with the discovery of several thousand asteroids.

Orbit and classification 

Aristophanes is a member of the Veritas family, a young family of carbonaceous asteroids, that formed approximately  million years ago. The family is named after 490 Veritas and consists of nearly 1,300 members.

It orbits the Sun in the outer main-belt at a distance of 3.0–3.3 AU once every 5 years and 8 months (2,062 days). Its orbit has an eccentricity of 0.05 and an inclination of 9° with respect to the ecliptic. The body's observation arc begins at Palomar, the night prior to its official discovery observation.

Physical characteristics 

In the SMASS classification, Aristophanes is a Ch-type, a hydrated subtype of the carbonaceous C-type asteroid with absorption features at 0.7 μm.

Rotation period 

As of 2017, no rotational lightcurve of Aristophanes has been obtained from photometric observations. The asteroid's rotation period, shape and poles remain unknown.

Diameter and albedo 

According to the survey carried out by the NEOWISE mission of NASA's Wide-field Infrared Survey Explorer, Aristophanes measures 21.941 kilometers in diameter and its surface has an albedo of 0.110.

Naming 

This minor planet was named after Aristophanes (445–385 B.C.), a Greek comic playwright of ancient Athens. The official naming citation was published by the Minor Planet Center on 29 September 1985.

References

External links 
 Asteroid Lightcurve Database (LCDB), query form (info )
 Dictionary of Minor Planet Names, Google books
 Asteroids and comets rotation curves, CdR – Observatoire de Genève, Raoul Behrend
 Discovery Circumstances: Numbered Minor Planets (1)-(5000) – Minor Planet Center
 
 

002934
Discoveries by Cornelis Johannes van Houten
Discoveries by Ingrid van Houten-Groeneveld
Discoveries by Tom Gehrels
4006
Named minor planets
2934 Aristophanes
002934
19600925